Miacis ("small point") is an extinct genus of placental mammals from clade Carnivoraformes, that lived in North America from early to middle Eocene.

Description
Miacis was five-clawed, about the size of a weasel (~30 cm), and lived on the North American continent. It retained some primitive characteristics such as low skulls, long slender bodies, long tails, and short legs. Miacis retained 44 teeth, although some reductions in this number were apparently in progress and some of the teeth were reduced in size.

The hind limbs were longer than the forelimbs, the pelvis was dog-like in form and structure, and some specialized traits were present in the vertebrae. It had retractable claws, agile joints for climbing, and binocular vision. Miacis and related forms had brains that were relatively larger than those of the creodonts, and the larger brain size as compared with body size probably reflects an increase in intelligence.

Like many other early carnivoramorphans, it was well suited for an arboreal climbing lifestyle with needle sharp claws, and had limbs and joints that resemble those of modern carnivorans. Miacis was probably a very agile forest dweller that preyed upon smaller animals, such as small mammals, reptiles, and birds, and might also have eaten eggs and fruits.

Classification and phylogeny

Classification

History of taxonomy
Since Edward Drinker Cope first described the genus Miacis in 1872, at least twenty other species have been assigned to Miacis. However, these species share few synapomorphies other than plesiomorphic characteristics of miacids in general. This reflects the fact that Miacis has been treated as a wastebasket taxon and contains a diverse collection of species that belong to the stemgroup within the Carnivoraformes. Many of the species originally assigned to Miacis have since been assigned to other genera and, apart from the type species, Miacis parvivorus, the remaining species are often referred to with Miacis in quotations (e.g. "Miacis" latidens). The following table lists the former Miacis species in chronological order of their original description and notes the reassignments to other genera.

Phylogeny
The phylogenetic relationships of genus Miacis are shown in the following cladogram:

In popular culture
In the episode "Mungu's Revenge", of the 1990s TV nature program Kratts' Creatures, Ttark says, "Now, did I ever tell you about that furry little Miacis of the late Paleocene period...or was that the early Eocene?".

See also
 Mammal classification
 Carnivoraformes
 Miacidae

References

†
Paleocene mammals of North America
Eocene mammals of North America
Prehistoric placental genera
Miacids
Transitional fossils
Paleocene carnivorans
Fossil taxa described in 1872